Nová Ves u Nepomuka is a village in Plzeň-South District, the Czech Republic. It is the part of Neurazy municipality. As of 2011, there were 90 inhabitants and 52 houses. The village was firstly mentioned in 1551.

Gallery

References 

Villages in Plzeň-South District